Al-Bahsa (also spelled Bahasa) is a village in northern Syria located in the Ziyarah Subdistrict of the al-Suqaylabiyah District in the Hama Governorate.  According to the Syria Central Bureau of Statistics (CBS), al-Bahsa had a population of 1,070 in the 2004 census. Its inhabitants are predominantly Alawites.

References 

Alawite communities in Syria
Populated places in al-Suqaylabiyah District